Kenneth Joseph Kenafick (11 April 1904 – 26 January 1982), also known by the pen names James Kennedy and Leo Conon, was an Australian poet, writer, translator and anti-conscription campaigner.

In 1950, he translated Michael Bakunin's book Marxism, Freedom and the State.

He was the secretary of the No Conscription Campaign and the organisation's successor League for Freedom. He was the editor of Anti-Militarist News and Review journal.

Early life and education 
Kenafick was born in 1904 at Norseman in Western Australia (graduating in 1932), and studied at the University of Western Australia and Melbourne Teachers' College.

Career 
After his education, Kenafick worked a teacher in high schools throughout Victoria. Three volumes of his poetry, written under the pseudonym James Kennedy, were published by Thomas Lothian from 1935 to 1939. In 1957, he published an autobiography under the pen name Leo Conon.

He was a member of the Victorian Teachers' Union and the Australian Labor Party, although he broke away from the party in support of Maurice Blackburn in 1942, becoming secretary of the No Conscription Campaign from 1943 to 1946. He was known for his anarcho-socialism and as a pacifist. His 1948 work, Michael Bakunin and Karl Marx is considered a good account of the Marx/Bakunin debate. He was Secretary of the No Conscription Campaign and the organization's successor, the League for Freedom, for many years. After organisation was renamed the League for Freedom and World Friendship, Kenafick became the editor of the journal it published in Melbourne: Anti-Militarist News and Review.

In 1950, he translated Michael Bakunin's book Marxism, Freedom and the State, published by Freedom Press in London, UK, which is widely cited.

Personal life and death 
Kenafick retired in 1968 and moved with his wife to Myrla near Wunkar in South Australia. He died in Loxton in 1982.

Selected publications 
Marxism, Freedom and the State, 1950s translation
Poems Lyrical and Descriptive, James Kennedy, Melbourne: Speciality Press, 1936 selected work poetry
Psyche and Eros, Romeo and Juliet, Two Poems James Kennedy, London: Arthur Barron, 1935 selected work poetry
The Iconoclast, Leo Conon, Ghaziabad : Bharti, 1957 novel
Newer Poems 1936-1938 James Kennedy , Melbourne : Lothian , 1939 selected work poetry
Richard of Gloucester, Kenneth Joseph Kenafick, 1972 drama
Maurice Blackburn and the No-Conscription Campaign in the Second World War (1948)
The Australian Labour Movement in Relation to War, Socialism and Internationalism (1958)
Michael Bakunin and Karl Marx, Melbourne: A. Maller (1948)

References

External links 
 Marxism, Freedom and the State, as translated by Kenafick
 Kenneth Joseph Kenafick, list of 76 works

1904 births
1982 deaths
20th-century Australian poets
Australian male poets
20th-century Australian male writers
Australian anarchists
Australian translators
People from Norseman, Western Australia
Writers from Western Australia
Translators from Russian
20th-century translators
Translators to English
Translators of philosophy
University of Western Australia alumni
20th-century Australian educators
People from Loxton, South Australia
Australian pacifists
Australian autobiographers